Star Trek: The Adventure Game is a 1985 board game published by West End Games.

Gameplay
Star Trek: The Adventure Game is a game based on the original Star Trek television series, set in the Organian Treaty Zone between the Federation and the Klingon Empire.

Reception
Tony Watson reviewed Star Trek: The Adventure Game in Space Gamer No. 76. Watson commented that "If you like Star Trek, you should get this game. the spirit of the show is captured admirably; all that seeking out of new worlds and civilizations is right there. This is not the game that FGU's Star Explorer (based on a pale imitation of the 'Trek' universe) tried to be, and it's much closer to the series than those 'armadas in space' titles put out by Task Force. This game is entertaining, simple, colorful and a lot of fun . . . not much different from the television series it's based on."

Phil Frances reviewed Star Trek: The Adventure Game for White Dwarf #81, and stated that "Star Trek: The Adventure Game can be played again and again. There are – even solitaire rules if you need them – this isn't a pushover to play, and I'd rank it with Valley of the Four Winds, Cosmic Encounter and all those other lovable classics."

Reviews
Different Worlds #41
Games

References

Board games based on Star Trek
Board games introduced in 1985
West End Games games